Natia Janjgava (born 16 December 1972) is a Georgian chess player who holds the FIDE title of Woman International Master (WIM, 1995). She is a winner of Georgian Women's Chess Championship (1994).

Biography
In 1990, Natia Janjgava participated in USSR Women's Chess Championship final and ranked 18th place. She participated in European Youth Chess Championships and World Youth Chess Championships where best result reached in 1991 in U20 girl's age group when ranked in 5th place. In 1993, in Polička, she shared first place in International Women's chess tournament. In 1994, she won Georgian Women's Chess Championship. In 1995, Janjgava participated in Women's World Chess Championship Interzonal Tournament in Chişinău where ranked 49th place.

In 1995, Janjgava was awarded the FIDE Woman International Master (WIM) title.

References

External links

1972 births
Living people
Female chess players from Georgia (country)
Chess Woman International Masters